Gustavo Tiberti (born 11 December 1959) is a former professional tennis player from Argentina.

Career
Tiberti defeated American qualifier Charles Strode in the opening round of the 1982 French Open. In the second round he met Damir Keretić, who he had beaten two weeks earlier in Florence, but on this occasion proved too strong for Tiberti in a five setter. At the 1983 French Open he again faced Keretic, this time in a first round match, which he lost in four sets.

On tour he had his best ever showing in 1982, at the Swedish Open, where he reached the semi-finals with wins over Thierry Tulasne, Jonathan Smith and Carl-Axel Hageskog. He was defeated by a young Mats Wilander in his semi-final.
 	
He had a good year playing doubles in 1986, finishing runner-up at two Grand Prix events, the Copa Banco Galacia (Buenos Aires) and Geneva Open. With his partner from those finals, Gustavo Luza, Tiberti also made the round of 16 at that year's French Open doubles.

Grand Prix career finals

Doubles: 2 (0–2)

Challenger titles

Doubles: (3)

References

1959 births
Living people
Argentine male tennis players
Sportspeople from Rosario, Santa Fe